Love and Again is a Hong Kong modern drama series produced by TVB starring Alex Fong, Sonija Kwok, Moses Chan, Michael Tse and Fiona Yuen. It was filmed from 2001 to 2002 and premiered overseas in November 2002. Then, it premiered on TVB Pay Vision on 29 March 2004 and ended on 23 April 2004. Later, it premiered on TVB Jade on 1 March 2011 and ended on 26 March.

Plot
Lau Fuk Wing (Michael Tse) and Suen Siu Yuet (Sonija Kwok) were a married couple with a child. Due to a car accident caused by Andy Leung Tak Wah (Alex Fong), an arrogant man disliked by those around him, Fuk Wing died and left Siu Yuet in grief.

Fuk Wing's soul refuses to reincarnate due to the feeling of injustice of how he died. So with the help of a ghost Ngau Yat Yat (Fiona Yuen), his soul accidentally enters the body of Tak Wah and once again tries pursue his wife as Tak Wah. As a result, he fails many times in trying to win Siu Yuet over after she finds out that Tak Wah was the one to cause Fuk Wing's death. Even after she is able to forgive that, a new man enters the scene and becomes another love rival to Fuk Wing/Tak Wa: Angus Ying Chun (Moses Chan), her dancing instructor.

Cast

The Leung family

The Lau family

The Ying family

Star Entertainment Group (星藝公司)

Underworld

Other cast

Reception

Critical Reception
Love and Again has received generally mixed reviews from critics. On Douban, the serial received a rating of 6.8 out of 10 based on over two hundred votes.

Love and Again has been criticized due to its theme being unclear and with the logic displayed in it which caused its ratings being mixed. However as years went by after its run, most viewers started to enjoy the show and compared it with the dramas that TVB produced nowadays.

References

External links
 TVBI website
 Love and Again forum at TVB.com

TVB dramas
Hong Kong television shows
Fantasy television series
2002 Hong Kong television series debuts
2002 Hong Kong television series endings
2011 Hong Kong television series debuts
2011 Hong Kong television series endings